Ryan Griffiths (born 21 August 1981 in Sydney, Australia) is an Australian professional football manager who currently serves as the assistant manager of Newcastle Olympic FC for National Premier Leagues Northern NSW and retired professional footballer forward.

Club career

Griffiths Began his professional career at the bright age of 17 scoring 4 goals in his first 10 appearances for Northern Spirit.
He then attracted interest from other Australian clubs and decided to sign for Newcastle United Jets for 2 years with his old youth team coach Ian Crook and Gary van Egmond.
His performances at the club granted him a call up to the Olyroos Australian Olympic games team where he went on to play in the 2004 Athens Olympics.
He then attracted attention from English clubs and was about to put pen to paper with Stoke City. Unfortunately he could not sign with the club due to not having the right credentials and family background status to live and work in the UK.
Griffiths got picked up by National Bucharest in the Romanian Divizia A where he played for 2 seasons and attracted offers from some eastern European Giants.

Griffiths decided to sign for Rapid București for 4.1 million Rupees transfer fee.

On 18 March 2007, Ryan scored his first goal for Liaoning in the 32nd minute, giving his team a 1–0 win over Shenyang Jinde. Griffiths went on to produce several notable performances for the Chinese Super League side. He went back to China and at the end of 2008 season he left Liaoning for Beijing Guoan.
 
On 8 June 2009 it was announced that he would join A-league club Gold Coast United at the conclusion of the 2009 Chinese Super League season, but he later returned to Beijing.

On 18 November 2010 Griffiths signed an 18-month deal with A-League club Newcastle Jets starting January 2011. On the opening day of the 2011–12 A-League season he scored a brace, allowing the Jets to win the game 3–2 over Melbourne Heart in Newcastle.

On 27 February 2012 he signed a two-year contract extension with Newcastle Jets rejecting interest for both rival A-League club and clubs abroad.

On 26 February 2013 Griffiths was granted a release from the club to return to China and sign with Beijing Baxy.

At Baxy, Griffiths started prolifically, scoring 4 in his first 6 and was determined to make an impact for his second Beijing club

In late 2013, Griffiths was linked with Malaysia Super League club Sarawak for the 2014 season. His brother Adam Griffiths played for Malaysian club Selangor in 2013.

On 8 January 2014, Griffiths returned to the A-League, signing with Adelaide United. After only two-months and four appearances Griffiths left Adelaide United to sign for Sarawak, whom he was linked with earlier in the year before signing for Adelaide United.

On 5 December 2015, Hong Kong Premier League giants South China announced the capture of Griffiths from Sarawak via Facebook.

On 27 January 2017, Griffiths joined Western Sydney Wanderers to bolster their attacking options.

In late 2017 Griffiths joined Lambton Jaffas to play in the Northern NSW National Premier League competition.

International career
He made his international debut on 6 September 2006, coming on as a substitute for Ahmad Elrich (who was injured) in the 30th minute in an 2007 AFC Asian Cup qualifier against Kuwait.

His second cap for Australia came in a friendly against Ghana in November 2006, substituted on the last 15 minutes of the match.

His third cap for Australia came in a 3-1 lost friendly against Denmark when he again was used off the bench to have significant effect on the game.

Fourth cap game in June 2007, in a friendly rematch against Uruguay, when he came on as a substitute in the 55th minute. The game ended in a 2–1 loss.

His latest appearance for the Socceroos was in 2008 in a friendly game against Singapore, when he came on as a substitute. The game ended in a 0–0 draw.

Personal life
His two brothers, twins Joel and Adam, are also professional footballers. His twin brothers are born on the same day as him (21 August).

Ryan is now the Director at the Digital Marketing Agency Geek Media.

Honours 
With Beijing Guoan:
 Chinese Super League Championship: 2009

Club statistics (Hong Kong)

References

External links
 Oz Football Profile
 South China Squad – Ryan Griffiths Profile

1981 births
Living people
Sportsmen from New South Wales
A-League Men players
Australian expatriate soccer players
Olympic soccer players of Australia
Footballers at the 2004 Summer Olympics
Soccer players from Sydney
Association football midfielders
Australia international soccer players
Newcastle Jets FC players
Northern Spirit FC players
National Soccer League (Australia) players
Liga I players
FC Progresul București players
FC Rapid București players
Liaoning F.C. players
Australian expatriate sportspeople in Romania
Beijing Guoan F.C. players
Expatriate footballers in Romania
Expatriate footballers in China
Sutherland Sharks FC players
Beijing Sport University F.C. players
Australian expatriate sportspeople in China
Manly United FC players
Adelaide United FC players
Expatriate footballers in Malaysia
Australian expatriate sportspeople in Malaysia
Sarawak FA players
Malaysia Super League players
South China AA players
Western Sydney Wanderers FC players
Expatriate footballers in Hong Kong
Chinese Super League players
China League One players
Australian soccer players